Hải Hưng is a former province in the Red River Delta of Vietnam. It was established in 1968. On November 6, 1996, Hai Hung was split into two provinces: Hải Dương and Hưng Yên.
The capital of Hải Hưng is Hải Dương. Hải Hưng had 1 town (Hưng Yên), and 10 districts: Chí Linh, Kim Môn, Nam Thanh, Cẩm Bình, Tứ Lộc, Ninh Thanh, Mỹ Văn, Châu Giang, Kim Thi and Phù Tiên.

Geography 
Hai Hung province has a geographical location:
 The North borders on the province Ha Bac and the city Hanoi
 The South borders the province Thai Binh and the province Ha Nam Ninh
 The East borders on the province Quang Ninh and the city Hai Phong
 The West borders on the province Ha Son Binh.

History 
On January 26, 1968, according to the Resolution of the Standing Committee Vietnam National Assembly, the two provinces Hai Duong and Hung Yen merged into Hai Hung province.  When merging, the province has 2 towns:  Hai Duong town (the provincial capital), Hung Yen town and 20 districts: En Thi, Binh Giang, Cam Giang, Chi Linh, Gia Loc, Khoai Chau, Kim Dong, Jincheng, Kinh Mon, My Hao, Nam Sach, Ninh Giang, Phu Cu, Thanh Ha, Thanh Mien, Tien Lu, Tu Ky, Van Giang, Van Lam, Yen My.

After merging the province, districts also proceeded to consolidate.

In 1977, it merged Cam Giang and Binh Giang into a district Cam Binh.

In 1979, merged Kim Thanh and Kinh Mon into a district Kim Mon; Nam Sach and Thanh Ha into districts Nam Thanh; Tu Ky and Gia Loc become a district Tu Loc; Thanh Mien and Ninh Giang into districts Ninh Thanh.

The year 1977, merged Phu Cu and Tien Lu into district Phu Tien, Van Giang and Yen My into district Van Yen, Van Lam and My Hao into a district Van My.

In 1979, the 14 communes of the district Van Yen were merged (including most of the old Yen My district) and the district Van My into a district My Van; merging the remaining 14 communes of Van Yen district (including most of old Van Giang district) and Khoai Chau district into district Chau Giang; Kim Dong and An Thi into districts Kim Thi.

Thus, the administrative unit of the province by the beginning of 1996 includes Hai Duong town (the provincial capital), Hung Yen town, 10 districts: Cam Binh, Chau Giang, Chi Linh, Kim Mon, Kim Thi, My Van, Nam Thanh, Ninh Thanh, Phu Tien, Tu Loc.

On January 27, 1996, Kim Thi district divided into 2 districts Kim Dong and An Thi, divided Ninh Thanh district into 2 districts: Ninh Giang and Thanh Mien, dividing Tu Loc district into two districts: Tu Ky and Gia Loc as before the merger.

By the end of 1996, the administrative units of the province include Hai Duong town (the provincial capital), Hung Yen town and 13 districts: An Thi, Cam Binh, Chau Giang, Chi Linh, Gia Loc, Kim Dong, Kim Mon, My Van, Nam Thanh, Ninh Giang, Phu Tien, Thanh Mien, Tu Ky.

On November 6, 1996, the 10th session of the IXth National Assembly issued a resolution to divide Hai Hung province to re-establish Hai Duong and Hung Yen provinces.

 The province Hai Duong includes Hai Duong town and 8 districts:  Cam Binh, Chi Linh, Gia Loc, Kim Mon, Nam Thanh, Ninh Giang, Thanh Mien, Tu Ky.
 The province Hung Yen includes Hung Yen town and 5 districts: An Thi, Chau Giang, Kim Dong, My Van, Phu Tien.

References 

Former provinces of Vietnam